The European Construction Technology Platform (ETCP) is a European Seventh Framework Programme initiative to improve the competitive situation of the European Union in the field of construction.

The programme is a joint initiative (Public-Private Partnership) of the European Commission, representing the European Communities, and the industry. The main objective of the program is to produce a Strategic Research Agenda. The initiative was launched on 12 July 2004.

See also
 European Technology Platform

References
 Vision 2030
 European Construction Technology Platform

External links
 European Construction Technology Platform

Science and technology in Europe
European Union and science and technology